Parvancorina is a genus of shield-shaped bilaterally symmetrical fossil animal that lived in the late Ediacaran seafloor. It has some superficial similarities with the Cambrian trilobite-like arthropods.

Etymology
The generic name is derived from a crasis compound word from the Latin parva ancora (small anchor).

The specific name of the type species, P. minchami, honors Mr. H. Mincham, the private collector, who in 1957 had collected and presented a number of fine specimens of Ediacaran fossils to the South Australian Museum.

The specific name of P. sagitta is the Latin word sagitta (arrow), in direct reference to the arrow-like shape.

Occurrence
P. minchami fossils were first discovered in the Ediacara Member of the Rawnslay Quartzite, Flinders Ranges, in South Australia. This species is also known from deposits of the Verkhovka, Zimnegory and Yorga Formations in the White Sea area of the Arkhangelsk Region, Russia. Additionally, similar poorly preserved Parvancorina sp. fossils were found in the Lyamtsa Formation of this Russian region.

P. sagitta is found in the Verkhovka formation on the Solza River, White Sea area of the Arkhangelsk Region, Russia.

Description

It has a raised ridge down the central axis of symmetry. This ridge can be high in unflattened fossils. At the 'head' end of the ridge there are two quarter-circle-shaped raised arcs attached. In front of this are two nested semicircular lines. Teeth seem to come from the raised parts pointing into the centre spaces. These may show as raised lines.

Affinity
In attempting to determine its phylogenic relationships, Parvancorina has been compared with trilobite-like arthropods, such as Skania from the Burgess Shale Biota, Canada, and Primicaris from the Chengjiang Biota, China.
However, the growth form of Parvancorina is unusual for an arthropod, and its apparent sessile mode of life appears to rebut an arthropod affinity. Furthermore, the strong resemblance of P. sagitta to the primitive mollusk-like bilateran Temnoxa and similarities to parts of Kimberella casts further doubt on an arthropod affinity.

Lifestyle and habitus
The living Parvancorinas typically lived with their "heads" parallel to the current direction. Overfolding of the fossils from all sides contradicts any form of stalked attachment to the sea floor.

See also

List of Ediacaran genera

References

External links
Ediacaran.org
Peripatus
Trilobites.info
Home of the Ediacaran

Ediacaran life
Enigmatic prehistoric animal genera
White Sea fossils
Fossil taxa described in 1958